

Ancient period
1550 BC: (EG) The Ebers Papyrus describes ancient Egyptian inhalation treatments for asthma.

Eighteenth Century (1700s)
1771: (US) Carl Scheele (1742–1786) makes "fire air" (oxygen) by heating magnesium oxide.  His findings are published in June 1774.
1774: (US) Joseph Priestley (1733–1804), credited with the discovery of oxygen, publishes his work on "dephlogisticated air" oxygen 3 months after a report by Carl Scheele.

Nineteenth Century (1800s)
1816: (US) Rene T.H. Laennec (1776–1856) invents the stethoscope for chest auscultation and lays the foundation for modern pulmonology with his book Diseases of the Chest.
1860: (US) Bunsen and Kirchhoff invent the spectrometer.
1860: (US) Stokes and Hoppe-Seyler demonstrate the oxygen transport function of hemoglobin.
1897: (DE) Gustav Killian performs the first bronchoscopy in Germany.
1899: (US) Dr. Thomas Willis defines specific Asthma symptoms for diagnosis.

Twentieth Century (1900s)

1900-1920 
1908: (US) George Poe demonstrated his mechanical respirator by asphyxiating dogs and seemingly bringing them back to life.
1918: Oxygen masks are used to treat combat-induced pulmonary edema.

1920-1940 
1928: Phillip Drinker develops the "iron lung" negative pressure ventilator.
1935: Carl Matthes invented the first noninvasive oximeter employing an ear probe.

1940-1960 
1943: Dr. Edwin R. Levine, MD began training technicians in basic inhalation therapy for post-surgical patients.
1946: (US) Dr Levine and his technicians formed the Inhalation Therapy Association.
1954: (US) March 16, 1954 the ITA is renamed the American Association of Inhalation Therapists (AAIT).
1966: (US) February 1966, the ITA was again renamed the American Association for Inhalation Therapy (still, AAIT).
1956: (US) The AAIT begins publishing a science journal, Inhalation Therapy (now RESPIRATORY CARE).
1960: (US)In October 1960 The American Registry of Inhalation Therapists (ARIT) is formed to oversee examinations for formal credentialing for people in the field.

1960-1980 
1961: (US) Sister Mary Yvonne Jenn becomes the first Registered Respiratory Therapist
1961: Metaproterenol, the beta-2 bronchodilator is introduced.
1964: (CA) The Canadian Society of Respiratory Therapists (CSRT)  is founded in 1964 as the Canadian Society of Inhalation Therapy Technicians.
1970: (US) In 1970 The Board of Schools of Inhalation Therapy Technicians became the Joint Review Committee for Respiratory Therapy Education (JRCRTE).
1971: (US) Continuous positive airway pressure (CPAP) is introduced by Gregory.
1971: (US) The journal Inhalation Therapy is renamed to Respiratory Care.
1974: (US) The two US credentialing programs merge into a single credentialing organization called the National Board for Respiratory Therapy (NBRT) in 1974.
1980: (US) President Jimmy Carter proclaimed the first Cystic Fibrosis Awareness Week. (July 22)

1980-2000 
1982: (US) California passes the first modern licensure law governing the profession of respiratory care.
1982: (US) In 1982 President Ronald Reagan proclaimed the first National Respiratory Care Week.
1986: (US) In 1986 the NBRT is renamed the National Board for Respiratory Care (NBRC).
1998: (US) The JRCRTE evolves into the Committee on Accreditation for Respiratory Care (CoARC).

Twenty-First Century (2000s)
2000: (US)  Respiratory Care journal is accepted into Index Medicus and its online counterpart, the MEDLINE service.
2004: (US)  Vermont becomes the 48th state to pass a Respiratory Care Act, effectively bringing legal credentialing to all 48 contiguous states in the United States.
2010: (US)  On December 14, 2010, the National Commission for Certifying Agencies (NCCA) grants accreditation to the Sleep Disorders Specialty Examination.  The CRT-SDS and RRT-SDS.
2011: (US) In July, 2011 the NBRC creates the Adult Critical Care Specialty for Registered Respiratory Therapists (RRT-ACCS).
2011: (US)  In 2011 the State of Hawaii became the 49th state in the United States to create a Board of Respiratory Care and enacting a Respiratory Care Act.
2012: (US)  In April, 2012 the Office of Regulation in the State of Michigan recommends the de-regulation of the respiratory therapy profession.

References

Pulmonology
Respiratory therapy
Respiratory therapy